Vatican City made its Mediterranean Games debut at the 2022 Edition in Oran, Algeria in an unofficial, non-scoring manner.

Medals

See also
Sport in Vatican City

References

Sport in Vatican City